Peter Murnoy was a nationalist politician and political activist in Northern Ireland.

Murnoy was a farmer and was a volunteer in the Irish Republican Army from 1916 until 1922. In 1926, he was the joint founder of the National Defence Association, which opposed recognition of Stormont. In 1937, Murnoy launched the National Council of Unity, which aimed to apply the new Constitution of Ireland to the whole of the island.

Murnoy was elected to the Parliament of Northern Ireland as the Nationalist Party MP for South Down at the 1945 general election.
He was active in the Irish Anti-Partition League, but controversially refused to condemn T. J. Campbell leaving the Parliament to become a judge. Murnoy was defeated at the South Down Nationalist selection convention before the 1949 Northern Ireland general election, and stood down.

References

Year of birth missing
Year of death missing
Irish Republican Army (1919–1922) members
Members of the House of Commons of Northern Ireland 1945–1949
Nationalist Party (Ireland) members of the House of Commons of Northern Ireland
Members of the House of Commons of Northern Ireland for County Down constituencies